This is an incomplete list of Georgian Orthodox churches in Armenia.

The list includes churches and monasteries of Georgian origin which were moved into the territory of the Armenian Soviet Socialist Republic after 1921 border changes between Armenia and Georgia caused by sovietization, and are now located in Armenia. Georgian Churches in Armenia are under the jurisdiction of the Eparchy of Dmanisi and Agarak-Tashiri based in Georgia.

See also 
Georgian Orthodox Church
Religion in Armenia

References 

 
Eastern Orthodoxy in Armenia
Georgian Orthodox Church